David Ernest Perks (born 16 December 1951) known as Dave Perks is a former speedway rider from England.

Speedway career 
Perks rode in the top two tiers of British Speedway from 1972 to 1987, riding for various clubs.

He began a cycle speedway career with a team called the Oldbury Lions and after one appearance for Scunthorpe Saints joined the Cradley Heathens in 1972. He won the Ivor Hughes Trophy for best novice during his inaugural season at Dudley Wood. In 1980, he joined Oxford Cheetahs and topped the league averages during the 1980 National League season with a 10.82 season average before sustaining a serious back injury in July. He became the club captain and exceeded a 10 point average again during the 1981 National League season. He returned to Long Eaton in 1982 but never reached the heights of his two years at Oxford.

In 1984, he won the silver medal at the National League Riders' Championship.

References 

Living people
1951 births
British speedway riders
Cradley Heathens riders
Long Eaton Invaders riders
Newcastle Diamonds riders
Oxford Cheetahs riders
Stoke Potters riders
Reading Racers riders